Lentzea roselyniae is a Gram-positive and aerobic bacterium from the genus Lentzea which has been isolated from hyperarid soil. Lentzea roselyniae is named after Roselyn Brown.

References

Pseudonocardiales
Bacteria described in 2010